Good to Die is an independent record label based in Seattle, Washington. Good to Die is owned and operated by Nik Christofferson and is distributed by the Burnside Distribution Corporation in Portland, Oregon. Good to Die releases records from acts in the underground rock scene of the Pacific Northwest including Sandrider, Gaytheist, Rabbits, and Kinski.

History
Good to Die was founded in June 2011. During the first year, the label released a number of albums, including those by Sandrider, Rabbits, Dog Shredder, Monogamy Party, Deadkill, Brokaw, Absolute Monarchs and Gaytheist.

In 2016, the label organized a five-year anniversary party, featuring many of the company's signed acts and a reunion of the Absolute Monarchs.

Selected artists

 Absolute Monarchs
 Blood Drugs
 Brokaw
 Constant Lovers
 Deadkill
 Dog Shredder
 Gaytheist
 Kinski
 Maximum Mad
 Merso
 Monogamy Party
 Old Iron
 Rabbits
 Sandrider

Release history

References

External links
 
 
 

American independent record labels
Companies based in Seattle
Record labels established in 2011